The 2011 Alberta Scotties Tournament of Hearts was the 2011 edition of the Alberta provincial women's curling championship. It was held January 26–30 at the Edgeworth Centre Encana Arena in Camrose, Alberta. The winning team of Shannon Kleibrink represented Alberta at the 2011 Scotties Tournament of Hearts in Charlottetown, Prince Edward Island, finishing 6-5 in round robin play.

Teams

Standings

Draw Brackets

A Event

B Event

C Event

Results

Draw 1
January 26, 9:30 AM MT

Draw 2
January 26, 6:30 PM MT

Draw 3
January 27, 9:00 AM MT

Draw 4
January 27, 2:00 PM MT

Draw 5
January 27, 6:30 PM MT

A Final
January 27, 6:30 PM MT

Draw 6
January 28, 9:00 AM MT

Draw 7
January 28, 2:00 PM MT

Draw 8
January 28, 6:30 PM MT

B Final
January 28, 6:30 PM MT

C Final 1
January 29, 1:00 PM MT

C Final 2
January 29, 1:00 PM MT

Playoffs

A1 vs. B1
January 29, 6:30 PM MT

C1 vs. C2
January 29, 6:30 PM MT

Semifinal
January 30, 9:30 AM MT

Final
January 30, 2:00 PM MT

References

Alberta
Sport in Camrose, Alberta
2011 in Alberta
Curling in Alberta